LeoCAD is a free and open-source 3D CAD program for creating virtual Lego models by using parts from LDraw library. It was developed by Leonardo Zide in 1997.

See also 
 Lego Digital Designer

References

Bibliography 
 T. Santos, A. Ferreira, F. Dias & M. J. Fonseca. Using Sketches and Retrieval to Create LEGO Models. Eurographics Workshop on Sketch-Based Interfaces and Modeling, 2008.
 Daniel Mendes, Alfredo Ferreira. Virtual LEGO Modelling on Multi-Touch Surfaces. WSCG'2011 Full Papers Proceedings, 2011. ISBN 978-80-86943-83-1
 Van Thanh Tran, Dongho Kim. An Application of Virtual Reality in E-learning based LEGO-Like Brick Assembling. School of Global Media, Soongsil University, Seoul, Korea, 2016.

External links
 
 

2006 software
Free software
Free and open-source software